The Kindred of the Sunset is an EP by German gothic metal band The Vision Bleak, released on 25 March 2016 through Prophecy Productions. It served as a teaser for the band's sixth studio album, The Unknown, which was released on 3 June 2016. The EP was announced on the band's official Facebook page on 21 February 2016, and four days later, on 25 February, the track listing was unveiled.

It contains four tracks; the first two were eventually featured on The Unknown, while the remaining two are EP-exclusive. A lyric video for the EP's eponymous track was uploaded to Prophecy's official YouTube channel on 24 March.

"The Sleeping Beauty" is a cover of the song by Swedish band Tiamat, originally present on their 1992 album Clouds.

Track listing

Personnel

The Vision Bleak
 Ulf Theodor Schwadorf (Markus Stock) – guitars, bass
 Allen B. Konstanz (Tobias Schönemann) – vocals, drums

Miscellaneous staff
 Martin Koller – production
 Łukasz Jaszak – cover art

References

External links
 The Vision Bleak's official website

The Vision Bleak albums
2016 EPs